Ronald Norman Haddrick  (9 April 1929 – 11 February 2020) was an Australian actor, cricketer, narrator and presenter. In 2012, he received the Actors Equity Lifetime Achievement Award for his long and distinguished career in media, spanning some seventy years both locally and also in Britain. He appeared in many  Shakespeare roles and often performed with theatre actress Ruth Cracknell.

At the time Australian playwright David Williamson said, "Ron Haddrick was chosen for two reasons. He’s a great actor, definitely one of the greatest of his generation, and also a great human being who has enriched the lives of countless Australians through his acting. He has also enriched the lives of many of us who work in the theatre because of his dedication and palpable decency." Actor John Bell in presenting the award said his "career has been extraordinary ... he is undoubtedly one of the leading lights in the Australian acting industry and he is much loved, admired and respected, because of both his professionalism and his good nature." On news of his death Bell Shakespeare said: “a legend of Australian theatre ... it was a privilege to have him grace our stage”.

Family
Haddrick was born in Adelaide, South Australia, the only son of Olive May (née Gibson) and Alexander Norman Haddrick. Haddrick's wife, Lorraine, received the Australian Sports Medal in 2000 for her "outstanding dedication to athletics as a volunteer official for 32 years". They had two children: NIDA graduate Lynette Haddrick and screenwriter and producer Greg Haddrick, and three grandchildren, Taya, Milly and Jack Haddrick.

Cricket career
As a sportsman, Haddrick played first-class cricket during the 1950s, representing South Australia on three occasions in the Sheffield Shield competition.

Professional acting career

Theatre
Haddrick first appeared on the stage in 1949 at the Adelaide Tivoli Theatre. Later, he was invited to join the Stratford Memorial Theatre (now the Royal Shakespeare Theatre). During five seasons in Stratford-upon-Avon he performed with Laurence Olivier, Vivien Leigh, John Gielgud, Peggy Ashcroft and Michael Redgrave. On his return to Sydney, roles followed with the Trust Players, and when the Old Tote Theatre Company formed, Haddrick played in over forty productions.

Radio and television
Haddrick has worked extensively in radio and TV throughout his career, notably for the Australian Broadcasting Corporation. He made an early television appearance in the 1960 television play Close to the Roof. He had his first starring TV role as Dr. William Redfern in The Outcasts, later appearing as the alien "Adam Suisse" in G K Saunders' pioneering children's science fiction series The Stranger, broadcast on the ABC in 1964–65. In 1969 and once more in 1982, he voiced Ebenezer Scrooge for two Australian produced adaptations of A Christmas Carol, giving way to more work along the same lines in the Australian animation field in 1977 with a shorter version of Jules Verne's Journey to the Center of the Earth.

Narrator
He has also narrated six audio books of the British children's TV series Thomas the Tank Engine & Friends released by ABC For Kids which were written by Christopher Awdry and illustrated by Ken Stott.

Haddrick is also known for having narrated all audio books of the Australian children's/young adult fantasy book series Deltora Quest written by Emily Rodda.

Selected works
Other stage work in the '70s and ‘80s included major roles for Sydney Theatre Company, State Theatre Company of South Australia and Queensland Theatre Company in classics and new Australian plays, including extensive seasons of the Nimrod Theatre Company production of The Club. Haddrick received two of the now defunct "Sydney Theatre Critics Circle Awards" for his performances in Long Day's Journey into Night and I'm Not Rappaport. The '90s saw him in many roles for Marian Street Theatre and the STC including his King Lear and his much loved Wacka Dawson in The One Day of the Year. Haddrick has appeared in Australian-made television from Certain Women and Heartbreak High to Farscape and in numerous feature films. Haddrick also played on The Lost Islands playing the tyrant "Q", a 200-year-old ruler. On radio, he has performed in hundreds of dramas, documentaries, special features and was frequently heard reading poetry for the ABC.

Haddrick and Cracknell
In 1960 Haddrick appeared at the Adelaide Festival of Arts in a production of Murder in the Cathedral in Bonython Hall. It marked the start of a long working partnership between Haddrick and Ruth Cracknell. In 1970 they performed in Sophocles' Oedipus Rex. It was directed for the Old Tote in Sydney by Sir Tyrone Guthrie and toured widely. In 1973, Haddrick, Ruth Cracknell, Gordon Chater and Garry McDonald appeared at the Australian Theatre in Newtown in a miscellany called Aurora Australis. They were in the Old Tote's production of David Williamson's What If You Died Tomorrow? in 1974 and it toured Australia and played in London at the Comedy Theatre. In the late 1970s they were in two Peter Williams' productions at the Theatre Royal, Sydney, Bedroom Farce and The Gin Game. In 1983 Haddrick and Cracknell played the theatrical Mr and Mrs Crummles in Richard Wherrett’s production of David Edgar's two-part Dickens marathon, The Life and Adventures of Nicholas Nickleby for the Sydney Theatre Company. This played at the Theatre Royal in Sydney and the State Theatre in Melbourne. In 1990 they were reunited in A.R. Gurney's Love Letters for the Sydney Theatre Company.

Death
Haddrick died at home on 11 February 2020. A memorial service was held at The Parade Theatre at NIDA on 1 March 2020, where speakers included actor and director John Bell and former Australian cricket captain Ian Chappell.

Honours
In 1974 he was made a Member of the Order of the British Empire (Civil Division) – For services to the Arts.
In 1977 he received the Queen Elizabeth II Silver Jubilee Medal.
In 2012 he was awarded an Actors Equity Lifetime Achievement Award – for a lifetime combining a phenomenal career with generous leadership and selfless mentorship presented by Actors Equity Australia.
In 2013 he was made a Member of the Order of Australia (General Division) – For significant service to the performing arts as an actor and narrator.

Filmography

References

External links
 Ron Haddrick at IMDb

1929 births
2020 deaths
Male actors from Adelaide
Australian cricketers
Australian male Shakespearean actors
Australian male film actors
Australian male musical theatre actors
Australian male stage actors
Australian male television actors
Australian television presenters
Australian male voice actors
Members of the Order of Australia
Australian Members of the Order of the British Empire
South Australia cricketers
Cricketers from Adelaide